Odynophagia is pain when swallowing. The pain may be felt in the mouth or throat and can occur with or without difficulty swallowing. The pain may be described as an ache, burning sensation, or occasionally a stabbing pain that radiates to the back. Odynophagia often results in inadvertent weight loss. The term is from - 'pain' and  'to eat'.

Causes
Odynophagia may have environmental or behavioral causes, such as:
 Very hot or cold food and drinks (termed cryodynophagia when associated with cold drinks, classically in the setting of cryoglobulinaemia).
 Taking certain medications
 Using drugs, tobacco, or alcohol
 Trauma or injury to the mouth, throat, or tongue

It can also be caused by certain medical conditions, such as:
 Ulcers
 Abscesses
 Upper respiratory tract infections
 Inflammation or infection of the mouth, tongue, or throat (esophagitis, pharyngitis, tonsillitis, epiglottitis)
 Immune disorders
 Oral or throat cancer

See also
 Phagophobia

References

External links 

Symptoms and signs: Digestive system and abdomen